A linguist is an academic who studies human language scientifically.

Linguist may also refer to:

People
 Language professional
 Translator
 Interpreter 
 Polyglot, one skilled in several languages
 Maurice Linguist (born 1984), American football coach

Periodicals
 The Linguist, a bimonthly British journal
 Linguist List (or LINGUIST), an online mailing list

See also
 Language education